The Dead Man's Knock, first published in 1958, is a detective story by John Dickson Carr which features Carr's series detective Gideon Fell.  This novel is a mystery of the type known as a locked room mystery.

Plot summary

In a little university town in the U.S. state of Virginia, surrounding Queen's College, Professor Mark Ruthven and his wife Brenda are arguing furiously because she is about to leave to meet her lover.  Before the night is over, young and voluptuous Rose Lestrange will apparently walk into her bedroom and stab herself with a razor-sharp dagger—at least, that's what the police say, because the windows and door are securely locked and bolted from the inside.  But Rose was being blackmailed.  Is the blackmailer the same person who's been playing vicious pranks around the College's grounds, and also the murderer?  Is the key to how the murder room was locked and bolted from the inside to be found in a locked-room mystery novel plotted by Wilkie Collins?  It takes Dr. Fell to sort out the lies and reveal the surprising truth.

References

1958 American novels
Novels by John Dickson Carr
Novels set in Virginia
Locked-room mysteries
Hamish Hamilton books
Harper & Brothers books